Crocker Mountain is a  peak located in Carrabassett Valley, Franklin County, Maine, in the United States.  Crocker Mountain is the fourth highest mountain in the state after the Katahdins (Baxter and Hamlin peaks) and Sugarloaf Mountain, and is part of the Appalachian Mountains. Crocker Mountain is traversed by the Appalachian Trail (AT), a  National Scenic Trail from Georgia to Maine.

A glacial cirque called "Crocker Cirque" is located between the main summit and the lower summit of South Crocker Mountain.  Crocker Cirque contains a small pond and can be reached via the Appalachian Trail.

Brooks on the east side of Crocker Mountain feed the South Branch of the Carrabassett River, which flows into the Kennebec River, and into the Gulf of Maine. The northwest side of Crocker drains into Stoney Brook, then into Stratton Brook, Flagstaff Lake, and the Dead River, another tributary of the Kennebec. The southwest side of Crocker drains into Nash Stream, then into the South Branch of the Dead River.

Gallery

See also 
 White Mountain National Forest

References

Mountains of Franklin County, Maine
Mountains on the Appalachian Trail
New England Four-thousand footers